Naked Hollywood is a 6 part TV series directed by Margy Kinmonth. The film includes Arnold Schwarzenegger, James Caan, Barry Diller, Joe Roth, Sydney Pollack, Oliver Stone, James Brooks, Nora Ephron, Terry Gilliam and many more. The film won a British Academy Film Award for Best Factual Series.

Premise
Publicity-shy to the point of paranoia, the talent agencies are Hollywood's Masonic lodges, secret brotherhoods wielding power behind the scenes.  As the movie business booms, competition for clients is intense.  The series watches talent spotters and agents in action as they make deals, poach each other's clients, and groom the stars of tomorrow.

Episodes
 The Actor and the Star - 24 February 1991
 Four Million Dollars is Cheap - 3 March 1991
 Good Cop, Bad Cop - 10 March 1991
 Funny for Money - 17 March 1991
 Eighteen Months to Live - 24 March 1991
 One Foot In, One Foot Out - 31 March 1991

References

External links
 

1991 British television series debuts
1991 British television series endings
1990s British television miniseries
BBC television documentaries
Documentary television series about art
Documentary films about Hollywood, Los Angeles
English-language television shows